Alexie Gilmore (born December 11, 1976) is an American actress who starred in New Amsterdam as Dr. Sara Dillane.  She is featured in Definitely, Maybe and co-starred in Surfer, Dude. Alexie also played the part of Kelly in Willow Creek. She played Devon Atwood in three episodes of CSI: Cyber as the wife of character Elijah Mundo. Alexie's other credits include 90210 and Legends.

Early life
Gilmore was born in Manhattan and moved to Tenafly, New Jersey, where she attended Tenafly High School. Gilmore attended Allentown College (now known as DeSales University) in Center Valley, Pennsylvania.

Filmography

Television

References

External links
 

1976 births
Living people
American television actresses
People from Tenafly, New Jersey
People from Manhattan
DeSales University alumni
Actresses from New Jersey
Actresses from New York City
American film actresses
20th-century American actresses
21st-century American actresses
Tenafly High School alumni